The International Youth Congress (IJK) is the largest annual meeting of young Esperantists in the world. The participants come from all over the world for one week, and they usually number around 300, although there has been a congress with more than 1000 attendees before. The congress takes place in a different country every year and is organized by the World Esperanto Youth Organization (TEJO), the youth wing of the Universal Esperanto Association (UEA). Both the IJK and the World Esperanto Congress take place each summer, usually in consecutive weeks but rarely in the same country.

List of congresses

Statistics

Countries
Countries by number of times as host:

Continents
Of the 74 congresses that have happened so far, 60 were hosted in Europe, 7 in Asia, 4 in North America, 2 in South America, 1 in Africa and none in Oceania.

Cities
Five cities have hosted the event twice:
 Groet (1938, 1948)
 Rotterdam (1960, 1967)
 Vraca (1963, 1993)
  Sarajevo (1972, 2006)
 Hanoi (2007, 2012)

See also
Internacia Junulara Festivalo

Notes

References

External links 
 Official TEJO Website
 IJK Website - Global information and form to join

Esperanto meetings